Sevanthi is an Indian Tamil-language family drama television series, starring Divya Sridhar and Nithin Iyer. It premiered on Sun TV on 11 July 2022, and airs on Monday to Saturday and is available for streaming in selected markets on Sun NXT.

Plot
Sevvanthi faces many struggles in life, so her husband Mano takes care of her and he was guided by his best friend Karthik.

Cast

Main
 Divya Sridhar as Sevanthi Manohar, Manohar's second wife
 Raaghav as Manohar Annamalai alias Mano Sevanthi's husband; Shruthi's ex-husband (deceased)
 Nithin Krish Iyer as Karthik, Manohar's friend

Recurring
 Vinoth as Raghunandan Annamalai alias Raghu (Manohar's brother and Poornima's husband)  
 Priyanka as Poornima Raghunandan (Raghunandan's wife)(Main Antagonist)
 SK Sivanya as Aishwarya (Manohar and Raghunandan's sister) 
 Azhagu as Annamalai (Manohar and Raghunandan, Aishwarya's father) 
 Jayanthi Narayanan as Rajeshwari Annamalai (Manohar and Raghunandan, Aishwarya's mother)  
 Premi as Manohar and Raghunandan, Aishwarya's grandmother
 Andrew Jesudoss as Sundharam (Rajam's husband) 
 Sri Vidhya Shankar as Rajam (Sundharam's wife) 
 Vijay Krishnaraj as Sevanthi's father  
 Jayaraman Mohan as Krishna (Radha's husband) 
 Neepa as Radha (Krishna's wife)
 Divyadharshini as Madhumitha (Manohar’s and Sruthi’s daughter)
 --- as Aravind (Manohar 's and Sevanthi 's Son)
 --- as Nandhini (Manohar 's and Sevanthi 's Daughter)
 Ramya Gowda as

Special Appearance 
 Sambhavi Gurumoorthy as Sruthi Manohar, Manohar's first Wife)
 Gabriella Sellus as Sundari
 Priyanka Nalkari as Roja

Production

Casting
Divya Sridhar was selected to play the titular role Sevvanthi along with film actor Raaghav, making his return to television after an hiatus of 9 years and Nithin Iyer.

Adaptations

References

External links
 Sevvanthi at Sun NXT

Sun TV original programming
Tamil-language melodrama television series
2022 Tamil-language television series debuts
Television shows set in Tamil Nadu
Tamil-language television soap operas